Patiala House is a 2011 Indian Hindi-language sports drama film directed by Nikkhil Advani and the film stars Rishi Kapoor, Dimple Kapadia, Akshay Kumar and Anushka Sharma in lead roles. It was produced by Bhushan Kumar, Mukesh Talreja, Krishan Kumar and Twinkle Khanna under the banner of People Tree Films, Credence Motion Pictures and Hari Om Entertainment. The film released on 11 February 2011. The theatrical trailer of the film was premièred with Farah Khan's Tees Maar Khan on 24 December 2010. Akshay's role of a fast bowler is loosely based on Monty Panesar. The film's idea was conceived by publicity designer Rahul Nanda, son of writer Gulshan Nanda.

Plot
The story revolves around Parghat Singh Kahlon alias Gattu / Kaali (Akshay Kumar), who is living the life his father Gurtej Singh Kahlon (Rishi Kapoor) chose for him. Gattu had been good at cricket and wanted to play for England though Gurtej would never let him become a member of the England team. Gurtej had threatened him earlier with suicide. His siblings hated him as he was an exemplary child in the house. He was alone without many friends until Zeeshan and his adoptive mother, Simran (Anushka Sharma) came into his life. Simran was Gattu’s childhood friend but the two had not met in years.

In the present day, Gattu gets another chance to fulfill his dream, and his siblings and Simran, convince him to give it a shot. If he gets on the team, they hope, Gurtej might be able to realize that the world isn't as racist as it used to be. As he gets on the team, they hide the fact that Gattu is on the team but Gurtej eventually finds out. Seeing his son on a team he despises gives him a heart attack and he ends up in the Emergency Room. Gattu plays cricket anyway for his siblings. He is deeply hurt to be disgraced by his father but he also loves cricket and hopes to change his father.

The people of Southall all come together and try to convince Gurtej that it is okay to be a cricket player for England. He locks himself inside the house where his wife tells him that she has never acted as a mother, only as a wife, and often forgot she was both. She turns on the T.V. wanting to see her son fulfill his dream. Gattu, who is being interviewed by Sanjay Manjrekar lies to him that his father is proud of him. Gurtej watches with her and realizes how badly he had treated his son. The family comes back into the house and Gurtej requests for one of them to drive him to the stadium. Gattu is playing poorly because he is upset that Gurtej disgraced him. Only at the last ball of the game, Gattu manages to get Andrew Symonds out for England by using the bowling style of former Indian cricketer Lala Amarnath. Gurtej apologizes to him and Gattu's siblings are now able to follow their dreams.

Cast
 Rishi Kapoor as Gurtej Singh Kahlon a.k.a. Bauji
 Kumud Mishra as young Gurtej Singh Kahlon, voiced by Rishi Kapoor
 Dimple Kapadia as Mrs. Guneet Kaur Kahlon a.k.a. Bebe
 Akshay Kumar as Parghat "Gattu" Singh Kahlon a.k.a. Kaali, a former fast bowler, loosely based upon Monty Panesar 
 Anushka Sharma as Simran Chaggal, Gattu's childhood friend and later love interest ; Zeeshan’s adoptive older sister/guardian/mom-like figure
 Devansh Daswani as Zeeshan Chaggal, Simran’s adoptive younger brother/son
 Soni Razdan as Dimple Bua
 Neelu Kohli as Harleen Chachi
 Hard Kaur as Komal Chatwal 
 Tinu Anand as Mr. Bedi, Selector #1
 Nasser Hussain as himself, Selector #2
 Andrew Symonds as himself
 Kieron Pollard as himself
 Herschelle Gibbs as himself
 Sanjay Manjrekar himself
 Shaun Tait as himself
 Hard Kaur as rapper
 Simi Melwani as Ashpreet Kaur
 Prem Chopra as Virendra Singh Saini (cameo appearance)
 Maya Salao as Manmeet Kaur
 Rabbit Sack C as Aman Singh Kahlon
 Arman Kirmani as Jaskaran 'Jassi' Singh Kahlon

Reception

Critical reception 
Patiala House met with mixed reviews. At one end of the scale, Kunal Guha of Yahoo! Movies and Rajeev Masand of CNN IBN gave the film 1.5/5 stars, with Masand arguing that Patiala House was "lacking subtleties and nuances" that could have made it truly heartfelt. Similarly, Mayank Shankar of Hindustan Times gave the movie 2/5, and Sonia Chopra of Sify awarded the movie 3/5 stars and described it as "predictable". A similar score was awarded by Anupama Chopra of NDTV who also gave it 3.5/5 stars but the reviewer described it as the "best work director Advani and actor Kumar have done in recent years" and argued that the movie "never soars but it is a notch better than the mediocre fare that we see every week."

Countering these, more positive reviews came from other sources. Aniruddha Guha from Daily News and Analysis and Sukanya Verma from Rediff Movies each awarded it 3 stars out of five, with Verma acknowledging Kumar's role: "Patiala House rests on Kumar's restraint and valiant performance". Smriti Sharma of India Today gave it 3.5/5 stars, describing it as an emotional journey, and Taran Adarsh of Bollywood Hungama awarded the film four stars, concluding that the "hallmark" of the film was the "merging of its engaging drama with cricket" and describing it as a "compelling watch".

On the review aggregator website ReviewGang, Patiala House has received a score of 8.5/10 from 21 users. On IMDB.com, the film has also received a mediocre rating average of 5.9/10 from over 1000 users.

Soundtrack

The music of the film was composed by Shankar–Ehsaan–Loy. Lyrics were penned by Anvita Dutt Guptan.

Reviews

The album received positive reviews upon release. Joginder Tuteja of Bollywood Hungama gave the soundtrack 4 out of 5 stars, saying "Patiala House delivers more than what one expected from the album.[..]it is obvious that listeners could well be picking up the first popular album of the new decade in the millennium." Rediff in a 3.5 star review said: "Akshay Kumar-Anushka Sharma starrer Patiala House is S-E-L's first release of the year, and it's good news for everyone concerned. You won't feel cheated for having brought an original copy of this CD."

References

External links

T-Series (company) films
2011 films
2010s sports drama films
2010s Hindi-language films
Films set in Punjab, India
Indian sports drama films
Hari Om Entertainment films
Films about cricket in India
Films directed by Nikkhil Advani
2011 drama films